Michèle Lazareff Rosier (3 June 1930 – 2 April 2017) was a French fashion journalist and designer who founded the V de V sportswear label. In addition to this, she worked as a film director and screenwriter since 1973.

Early life and education
Born Michèle Raudnitz in 1930, her mother was the journalist Hélène Gordon-Lazareff (1909–1988), and Michèle was the child from Hélène's first marriage to Paul Raudnitz. After Hélène's second marriage to Pierre Lazareff (1907–1972), Pierre adopted Michèle as his daughter and she becane Michèle Rosier. Pierre and Hélène founded Elle  magazine. At age 10, Michèle was the first child to read The Little Prince by Antoine de Saint-Exupéry, a close friend of the family.

She studied at the Nightingale-Bamford School in New York.

Journalism
Lazareff Rosier started out as a journalist for her father's daily paper, France Soir before becoming chief editor of the magazine Le Nouveau Femina that took its name from the earlier French woman's magazine Femina launched in 1901 by Pierre Lafitte and discontinued in 1954.

Fashion
In the early 1960s Rosier founded V de V (which stands for Vêtements de Vacance, or 'Holiday Wear'). She also designed for at least two other lines: dresses for Chloe D'Alby, and a line of affordable furs called Monsieur Z which included pink and blue dyed rabbit fur coats. However, her V de V designs, including both fashionable sportswear and activewear such as swimwear and ski-wear, were very successful. She was noted as an early adopter of vinyl and stretch fabrics, with one New York reporter commenting in 1965 on the close similarity between her two-colour jersey dresses and Yves Saint Laurent's subsequent Mondrian dresses. Due to her love of plastics, she was nicknamed the "Vinyl Girl," and has been credited with introducing vinyl to Paris fashion before André Courrèges, to whom she was compared by the International Herald Tribune for her "style without nostalgia." She was credited with being the first designer to deliberately use outsize industrial zippers. A contemporary press piece in 1968 ranked Rosier alongside Emmanuelle Khanh and Christiane Bailly as part of a "new race" of innovative and exciting young French designers, described as "stylists who work for ready-to-wear."

Rosier, herself a keen skier, produced particularly distinctive ski-wear whose streamlined design was in stark contrast to previous models. In 1966 Eugenia Sheppard proclaimed that Rosier's slimline skiwear had "defeated the old-time bulky teddy-bear look". Other suits were made in quilted nylon velvet and vivid colours with detachable face panels such as the one featured on the front cover of Sports Illustrated magazine for 13 November 1967. She offered helmets with rotating green-to-clear visors (designed by Monique Dofny) and her "stainless steel" and silver suits in nylon and lurex were described as "pure James Bond," and having "cosmic flair."

Rosier also designed for White Stag in the US, and Jaeger in the UK. One of her clear PVC raincoats for Young Jaeger was chosen by Ernestine Carter as part of the Dress of the Year for 1966, along with a Simone Mirman hat and a Young Jaeger black and white dress. She designed parachute jumpsuits for Raquel Welch to wear in the 1967 film Fathom. In 1988, V de V was purchased by Sergio Tacchini.

Films
Since 1973 Rosier worked as a film director and screenwriter for French-language cinema. Her first two films  George Who?, a biography of George Sand, and Mon coeur est rouge (Paint my Heart Red), which deals with a female market researcher, have been described as feminist. She then produced television documentaries before returning to films with Embrasse-moi (1989).

As producer, director & writer
 Mon coeur est rouge aka Paint my Heart Red(1976)

As director & writer
 George qui? aka George Who? (1973)
 Embrasse-moi (1989)
 Pullman paradis (1995)
 Malraux, tu m'étonnes! (2001)

Director only
 Ah! La libido (2009)

Television documentaries
 Le Futur des Femmes (1975)
 La Demoiselle aux Oiseaux (1976)
 Mimi (1979)
 Un Café Un! (1981)
 Le Gros Départ (1982)
 Botaniques (series of five short documentaries, 1982)

References

Biography
 Lydia Kamitsis, Michèle Rosier, Paris, Editions du Regard, 2014, 136 p.

1930 births
2017 deaths
French documentary filmmakers
French fashion designers
French film directors
French women film directors
French people of Russian-Jewish descent
French women screenwriters
French screenwriters
Women documentary filmmakers
French women fashion designers
Nightingale-Bamford School alumni